Evening Gazette is or was the name of several local newspapers:
United Kingdom
 Colchester Evening Gazette
 Evening Gazette (Essex)
 Teesside Gazette's cover page title prior to 2014 (since then, simply The Gazette)

United States
 Reno Gazette-Journal, formed from the merger of the Nevada State Journal and the Reno Evening Gazette
 Telegram & Gazette, formed from the merger of Worcester Telegram and Evening Gazette in Worcester, Massachusetts
 Evening Gazette, Port Jervis, New York